Embertoniphanta farafanga or Helicophanta farafanga is a species of air-breathing land snail, a terrestrial pulmonate gastropods mollusk in the family Acavidae. The species occurs in Madagascar.

Helicophanta farafanga is a burrower.

References

Acavidae
Gastropods described in 1875